Women & Songs is the first in a similarly named series of Canadian albums.  The initial album was released in 1997 and features 17 tracks, all by female artists.

Track listing 
 Foolish Games [Radio Edit] (Jewel Kitcher) [4:01]
(performed by Jewel)
 Good Mother (Robert Foster/Jann Arden Richards) [4:58]
(performed by Jann Arden)
 I Will Remember You (Seamus Egan/Sarah McLachlan/Dave Merenda) [4:55]
(performed by Sarah McLachlan)
 Where Have All the Cowboys Gone (Paula Cole) [3:47]
(performed by Paula Cole)
 Missing (Tracey Thorn/Ben Watt) [4:04]
(performed by Everything But The Girl)
 32 Flavors (Ani DiFranco) [3:46]
(performed by Alana Davis)
 Tom's Diner (Suzanne Vega) [3:50]
(performed by DNA and Suzanne Vega)
 Sand and Water (Beth Nielsen Chapman) [4:08]
(performed by Beth Nielsen Chapman)
 I'll Stand by You (Chrissie Hynde/Tom Kelly/Billy Steinberg) [3:59]
(performed by The Pretenders)
 Hand to Mouthville (Kacy Crowley) [3:39]
(performed by Kacy Crowley)
 Constant Craving (k.d. lang/Ben Mink) [3:40]
(performed by k.d. lang)
 Closer to Fine (K. Hunter/Emily Saliers) [4:01]
(performed by Indigo Girls)
 I Love You Always Forever (Donna Lewis) [3:21]
(performed by Donna Lewis)
 Dark Horse (Amanda Marshall/Dean McTaggart/David Tyson) [3:58]
(performed by Mila Mason)
 Runaway (The Corrs) [3:47]
(performed by The Corrs)
 Dogs and Thunder (Sarah Harmer) [5:10]
(performed by Weeping Tile)
 Goodbye (Steve Earle) [4:53]
(performed by Emmylou Harris)

References
 [ Women & Songs at AllMusic]

1997 compilation albums